Associazione Calcio Belluno 1905 was an Italian association football club located in Belluno, Veneto.

History 
The club was founded in 1905.

Serie C 
It has played 9 seasons in Serie C and 2 in Serie C2.

It was relegated from Serie C2 in 2003–04 to Serie D where it currently plays.

Colors and badge 
Its colors are yellow and blue.

External links 
 Official homepage 

Football clubs in Italy
Football clubs in Veneto
Association football clubs established in 1905
Serie C clubs
Belluno
1905 establishments in Italy